Tabanelli is a surname. Notable people with the surname include:

Andrea Tabanelli (1961–2020), Italian wheelchair curler
Andrea Tabanelli (born 1990), Italian footballer

Italian-language surnames